Legalman (abbreviated as LN) is a  United States Navy occupational rating.

Legalmen:
 Perform paralegal duties under the direction and supervision of Judge Advocates in providing and administering legal services, including matters concerned with military justice, administrative discharges, claims, admiralty law and legal assistance
 Record and transcribe proceedings of courts-martial, courts of inquiry, investigations and military commissions and prepare and submit necessary records and reports
 Prepare correspondence
 Conduct interviews
 Serve as military notaries public
 Perform legal research of pertinent material for evaluation
 Provide advice and assistance to personnel and command on matters of legal administration

See also
 (at "Legalman")

References

United States Navy ratings
Legal occupations in the military